Alasdair William Richardson Whittle,  (born 7 May 1949) is a British archaeologist and academic, specialising in Neolithic Europe. He was Distinguished Research Professor of Archaeology at Cardiff University from 1997 to 2018.

Whittle was born on 7 May 1949. He studied Literae Humaniores (i.e.  classics) at Christ Church, Oxford, graduating with a Bachelor of Arts (BA) degree. He remained at Oxford to study for a Doctor of Philosophy (DPhil) degree, which he completed in 1976 with a thesis titled "The Earlier Neolithic of Southern England and its Continental Contacts".

In 1998, Whittle was elected a Fellow of the British Academy (FBA), the United Kingdom's national academy for the humanities and social sciences. He is also a founding Fellow of the Learned Society of Wales (FLSW).

Publications 

 (editor, with Vicki Cummings) Going Over: The Mesolithic-Neolithic Transition in North-West Europe
 Europe in the Neolithic: the creation of new worlds
 The Archaeology of People: Dimensions of Neolithic Life
 Sacred Mound, Holy Ring.
  Problems in Neolithic Archaeology

References

External links
Professor Whittle's homepage

British archaeologists
Academics of Cardiff University
Fellows of the Learned Society of Wales
Living people
Fellows of the British Academy
1949 births
Prehistorians
Alumni of Christ Church, Oxford